Sven Kullander is the name of:

 Sven Kullander (physicist) (1936–2014), Swedish physicist, Professor Emeritus at Uppsala University
 Sven O. Kullander (born 1952), Swedish biologist specialising in ichthyology, first steward at the Swedish Museum of Natural History in Stockholm